Benjamin Franklin Bush (July 5, 1860July 28, 1927) was an American railroad executive. At various times he served as the president of the Missouri Pacific Railroad, the St. Louis, Iron Mountain and Southern Railway (later part of the Missouri Pacific), the Western Maryland Railway, the Denver and Rio Grande Western Railroad, and the Western Pacific Railroad.

His entry in the 1913 edition of The Biographical Directory of the Railway Officials of America reads:

"President, Missouri Pacific; St. Louis, Iron Mountain and Southern; Denver and Rio Grande.
Office: St. Louis, Missouri.
Born: July 5, 1860, at Wellsboro, Pennsylvania.
Education: Public schools, Wellsboro, Pennsylvania, and State Normal School, Mansfield, Pennsylvania.
Entered railway service: 1882, as rodman on the Northern Pacific, since which he has been consecutively locating and division engineer, same road; 1887 to 1889, division engineer, Union Pacific; 1889 to 1896, chief engineer and general superintendent, Oregon Improvement Company, controlling coal properties of Northern Pacific; February, 1903, to 1907, fuel agent, Missouri Pacific; 1907 to 1908, president, Western Maryland; 1908, appointed receiver, same road, and upon reorganization again elected president; May 1, 1911, to date, president, Missouri Pacific; St. Louis, Iron Mountain and Southern; January 4, 1912, to date, also president, Denver and Rio Grande."

The village of Bush, Illinois, is named in his honor.

See also

 List of people from St. Louis, Missouri
 List of people from Pennsylvania
 List of railroad executives

References 

 Lane, Harold Francis, editor. The Biographical Directory of the Railway Officials of America, 1913 Edition. New York: Simmons-Boardman, 1913, p. 78.

1860 births
1927 deaths
19th-century American railroad executives
20th-century American businesspeople
Businesspeople from Missouri
Businesspeople from Pennsylvania
Denver and Rio Grande Western Railroad
Mansfield University of Pennsylvania alumni
Businesspeople from St. Louis
People from Wellsboro, Pennsylvania
Northern Pacific Railway people
Union Pacific Railroad people
Western Maryland Railway
Western Pacific Railroad